Yugo-nostalgia (Slovene, Macedonian, and ) is a political and cultural phenomenon found among the populations of the former Yugoslavia, in the present-day Bosnia and Herzegovina, Croatia, Montenegro, North Macedonia, Serbia, Kosovo, and Slovenia. It refers to an emotional longing for a time past when the splintered states were a part of one country, grief over the war that tore it apart, and a desire to again unite. Self-described "Yugo-nostalgics" may assert their grief that brotherly love, unity, and coexistence failed, while division and nationalism won, or they may assert that their quality of life was better.

While its anthropological and sociological aspects have not been extensively studied, it can also be used negatively and ethnocentrically to denigrate someone usually of the same ethnic background who expresses sympathy or statement of support for any aspect of Yugoslavia against the prevailing nationalist zeitgeist.

Present cultural and economic manifestations of Yugo-nostalgia include music groups with Yugoslav or Titoist retro iconography, art works, films, theater performances, and many organized, themed tours of the main cities of the former Yugoslav republics. The notion of Yugo-nostalgia should not be confused with Yugoslavism which is the ideology behind the unity of South Slavic nations. The concepts have some overlap but Yugo-nostalgia celebrates the pre-1991 period whereas Yugoslavism and Yugoslav reunification (as a branch of pan-Slavism) are an ongoing mindset just as likely to appeal to persons born after the breakup of Yugoslavia that feel their national interests may be best served by unification.

According to a Gallup poll from 2017, 81% of Serbs think that the breakup of Yugoslavia harmed their country, while 77% of Bosnians and Herzegovinians, 65% of Montenegrins and 61% of Macedonians agree. Only 4% of Serbs think that the break-up of Yugoslavia was beneficial for their country, while just 6% of Bosniaks and 15% of Montenegrins feel positive about the split. In Croatia, 55% of respondents saw the break-up as beneficial and just 23% as harmful. In Slovenia, 41% see the break-up as beneficial while 45% think it was harmful. The highest number of respondents who welcomed the break-up of Yugoslavia were in Kosovo which declared independence in 2008, where 75% said the split was beneficial and only 10% regretted it.

Positive sense

In its positive sense, Yugo-nostalgia refers to a nostalgic emotional attachment to both subjective and objectively desirable aspects of the SFRY. These are described as one or more of: economic security, sense of solidarity, socialist ideology, multiculturalism, internationalism and non-alignment, history, customs and traditions, and more rewarding way of life. As Halligan argues, such nostalgia effectively "reclaims" pre-1989 cultural artefacts, even propaganda films. These positive facets, however, are opposed to the perceived faults of the successor countries, many of which are still burdened by the consequences of the Yugoslav wars and are in various stages of economic and political transition.  The faults are variously identified as parochialism, jingoism, corruption in politics and business, the disappearance of the social safety net, economic hardship, income inequities, higher crime rates, as well as a general disarray in administrative and other state institutions.

Negative sense
In the negative sense, the epithet has been used by the supporters of the new post-dissolution regimes to portray their critics as anachronistic, unrealistic, unpatriotic, and potential traitors.  In particular, during and after the Yugoslav wars, the adjective has been used by state officials and media of some successor countries to deflect criticism and discredit certain avenues of political debate.  In fact, it is likely that the term Yugo-nostalgic was originally coined precisely for this purpose, appearing as a politically motivated pejorative label in government-controlled media, for example in Croatia, very soon after the breakup of the SFRY.

According to Dubravka Ugrešić the term Yugo-nostalgic is used to discredit a person as a public enemy and a "traitor".

Yugoslavism after Yugoslavia

After the initial breakup of Yugoslavia throughout 1990s, Montenegro and Serbia continued a state union as the Federal Republic of Yugoslavia from April 1992 to February 2003, then simply as Serbia and Montenegro until its own dissolution in June 2006. The number of self-declared Yugoslavs (in the ethnic sense) in the region reached an all-time low after the breakup of Yugoslavia. The former country's main language, Serbo-Croatian, is no longer the official language of any of the former state's constituent republics. There are few works published about the language, and it no longer has a standardizing body. The .yu Internet domain name, which was popular among Yugo-nostalgic websites, was phased out in 2010.

Yugo-nostalgia is seeing a comeback in the former Yugoslav states. In Subotica, Vojvodina (northern province of Serbia), one man has set up Yugoland, a theme park dedicated to Tito and Yugoslavia. Kumrovec, a small village in Croatian Zagorje known as the birthplace of Josip Broz Tito, and his resting place at the House of Flowers remain as two of the prominent gathering spots for yugo-nostalgics, gathering up to several thousand visitors each year at the celebration of former country's Youth Day (popularly known as Tito's birthday). Citizens from all over former Yugoslavia travel great distances to celebrate the legacy of the late country of Yugoslavia.

In Croatia, the "Alliance of Yugoslavs" was established in 2010 in Zagreb, an association aiming to unite the Yugoslavs of Croatia, regardless of religion, gender, political or other views. Its main goal is the official recognition of the Yugoslav nation in every Yugoslav successor state: Bosnia and Herzegovina, Croatia, Kosovo, North Macedonia, Montenegro, Serbia and Slovenia.

Another organization advocating Yugoslavism is the "Our Yugoslavia" association founded on 30 July 2009, seated in Pula, which is an officially registered organization in Croatia. The association has most members in the towns of Rijeka, Zagreb and Pula. Its main aim is the stabilisation of relations among the Yugoslav successor states. It is also active in Bosnia and Herzegovina, however, its official registration as an association was denied by the Bosnian state authorities.

The probably best-known Yugoslavist organization in Montenegro is the "Consulate-general of the SFRY" with its headquarters in the coastal town of Tivat. Prior to the population census of 2011, Marko Perković, the president of this organization called on the Yugoslavs of Montenegro to freely declare their Yugoslav identity on the upcoming census.

Yugo-nostalgia retains a stronghold among former Yugoslav populations who emigrated the country before its breakup, most prominently in the United States, Canada and Australia. They have been described as 'de-patriated': "scattered all over the world, without a homeland" or "a hope of returning home someday".

Yugoslav reunification 

Yugoslav reunification refers to an idea of reunification of some or all of the former republics. Despite a grassroots appeal across the former territory, its proponents are resigned to the notion that such a state is not likely to come into fruition since the successor regimes have firmly cemented their commitment to an independent existence, having established their institutions and chosen their respective directions.

See also

 Balkanization
 Communist nostalgia, similar in different places
 Ostalgie, nostalgia for the former East Germany
 PRL nostalgia, nostalgia for the former Polish People's Republic
 Soviet nostalgia, nostalgia for the former Soviet Union
 Titoism
 Yugoslavs
 Yugoslav Americans
 Yugoslav Canadians
 Yugoslavs in Serbia
 Yugoslavism

References

Bibliography
 Halligan, Benjamin: "Idylls of Socialism: The Sarajevo Documentary School and the Problem of the Bosnian Sub-proletariat". In Studies in Eastern European Cinema (Autumn 2010). (http://usir.salford.ac.uk/11571/3/visualrecollectivisationpostcopyedit.pdf)
 
 Trovesi, Andrea: L'enciclopedia della Jugonostalgija. In Banchelli, Eva: Taste the East: Linguaggi e forme dell'Ostalgie, Sestante Edizioni, Bergamo 2006, p. .
 
 Volcic, Zala, "Yugo-Nostalgia: Cultural Memory and Media in the Former Yugoslavia," Critical Studies in Media Communication, Volume 24, Number 1, March 2007: 257-274
Kristen R. Ghodsee, "Red Nostalgia? Communism, Women's Emancipation, and Economic Transformation in Bulgaria."

External links

Communist nostalgia
Nostalgia
Pan-Slavism